Orexana ultima is a species of air-breathing land snail, a terrestrial pulmonate gastropod mollusk in the family Geomitridae, the hairy snails and their allies. 

The species is endemic to Fuerteventura island (Canary Islands).

Endemic fauna of the Canary Islands

References 

Geomitridae
Gastropods described in 1872